Ascuta media is a species of spider in the family Orsolobidae. It is endemic to New Zealand.

Taxonomy 
Ascuta media was described in 1956 by Raymond Forster.

Description 
Cephalothorax and chelicerae are a uniform brown colour. Legs are paler in colour. Eyes are ringed with black colour. Abdomen is creamy white with chevron patterns.

Distribution 
Ascuta media is endemic to Fiordland in New Zealand.

References 

 Spiders described in 1956
 Spiders of New Zealand
Orsolobidae
Endemic spiders of New Zealand